Bunny Maloney is a computer-animated television series created by Studio Tanuki and directed by Stéphane Stoll. The series is produced by MoonScoop Group, in co-production with France 2 and Telegael Teoranta. It was based on a Flash-animated pilot called The Attack of the Giant Red Octopus. The series chronicles the adventures of a pink anthropomorphic rabbit named Bunny Maloney and his friends. The series was canceled after one season, due to low ratings and highly negative criticism over the show's inappropriate themes.

In France, Bunny Maloney was broadcast for the first time on June 29, 2009, on the TV channels Canal+ and Canal+ Family during the Cartoon+ programming block. An English dub aired on Kabillion (along with official videos of the show on their YouTube channel), but any trace of the show has later been removed. The series is currently distributed on Apple TV's French website.<ref>Bunny Maloney - Apple TV Français.</ref>

 Synopsis 
The series stars the titular Bunny Maloney, who is a pink anthropomorphic rabbit, and he is often blundering and over-confident. He lives in an apartment with his friends Candy Bunny (another pink rabbit, and his girlfriend), and Jean-François (a blue dog-like creature). Sometimes, they are accompanied by a badger called Stan Ookie. They live in Bunnyville, a town that is the target of their sworn enemy, the infamous Professor Débilouman, along with his companion, Modchi.

In almost every episode, as members of Bunnyville's ProtecTeam, they end up having to foil Débilouman's plan aboard their robot, the Bunnyganger-28. As a running gag, Débilouman's submarine (the Tsunami) will sink from missiles (unintentional or not) or by pressing a red button at its control panel.

The series also includes elements akin to Japanese culture - it has elements reminiscent of manga and anime in its design, followed by some manga iconography and instances of text being written with the Japanese language. Some episodes also reference popular culture, like the franchise James Bond.

 Characters 
 Bunny Maloney - A pink rabbit. The ProtecTeam's leader, he is a fun-loving rascal who often lazes around, occasionally watching TV. He is also somewhat of a fast food junkie. He is sometimes petty and selfish. He owns four pet fish, to which he sometimes gushes about in certain episodes.
 Candy Bunny - Another pink rabbit, but with a red scrunchie and prominent blush. She is Bunny's girlfriend, who is a bossy, cranky rabbit with a high temper. In spite of her relationship with Bunny, Candy frequently takes her anger out at him. She owns a pet called Potchi.
 Jean-François - A mysterious blue creature who can only speak his own name, having droopy ears and large black eyes that lack highlights. In spite of his constant blank expressions, he is calm and kind-hearted, trying his best. He sometimes is seen playing the fictional game, "Bust-a Para Dance".
 Stan Ookie - He talks to the ProtecTeam within a blue hologram, as he lives in the building for the Bunnyganger. He often uses the word "dude", like a stereotypical surfer. While he tries to help out the ProtecTeam, he also has a dorky, goofier side in "Stan's Perfect Match". His name is a pun on the tanuki.
 Professor Débilouman - The ProtecTeam's arch-nemesis, and the main villain of the series. He frequently comes up with ridiculous schemes, some of which are against Bunny (who he hates the most). "Débile" in French means "stupid", fitting his petty, comical personality. He also has a crush on Candy.
 Modchi - Débilouman's companion, who is sarcastic and condescending. In spite of being on Débilouman's side, he does not bother to actively participate in his plans, or have much of a grudge against the opposing ProtecTeam. He resembles Potchi in appearance, but with bumps, a scar and bigger eyes that have red sclerae.

Bunnyville also has a variety of weird and quirky residents that often appear throughout the course of the show. These other characters include:
 Charlotte, a white spotless cow who is Candy's best friend. She is ditzy and lustful, sometimes posing in suggestive ways and fawning over boys. She mainly has a crush towards Bunny (to which he dislikes).
 Louis Picollin, a fat fly wearing green who idolizes Bunny, much to the latter's chagrin. Aside from being a superhero wannabe, he also cleans poop around the city.
 Noacak, the general of his army in Bunnyville. While he appears to be a serious, well-meaning leader toward his troops, he is also comically incompetent. He is similar to Major Monogram from the series Phineas and Ferb.
 Secretary Octopus, the news reporter for Bunnyville. A purple bipedal octopus, she usually is seen on the ProtecTeam's television to report something relevant to an episode.
 The Amazing Secret Spies, Débilouman's spies who are part of some of his plans. They can only say one word and all look the exact same, wearing opaque black shades.
 Marc and Ting, a duo of quirky, yet strange, salesmen who show up for any sort of marketing opportunity, and appear in Bunnyville's commercials. They wear matching tuxedos and glasses. Their names are a play on the word "marketing".

 Episodes 

 Casanova Clone ("Candy voit double")
 Text Message Madness ("Sos SMS")
 Atomic Flea ("La puce atomique")
 Rabid Rabbit ("Bunny-sitter")
 Hasta La Vista, Bunny ("Hasta la vista, Bunny !")
 Candy's Birthday Surprise ("Joyeux anniversaire, Candy !")
 Noacak Wants You ("En avant, marche !")
 A Wrinkle in the ProtecTeam ("Ô ride, ô désespoir")
 Polterabbitgeist ("Nos ancêtres les lapins")
 Bunny's Fish Go Off ("Mes chers poissons")
 Bunny's Big Hit ("Bunny rebondit")
 Carrots Are a Girl’s Best Friend ("Les carottes sont éternelles")
 Germ-Free ("Ménage de printemps")
 Spouse or Louse ("Moitié ou minable")
 The Dispense-Sense 9000 ("L'interprétator 9000")
 Dawn of the Shrimp ("La Nuit des Crevettes Zombies")
 Jean-François: Super Model ("Jean François top modèle")
 Bunnies Are From Mars ("Les lapins viennent de Mars")
 Community Service ("Travaux d'intérêt général")
 Stuck With Me (“Sauve qui peut”)
 Free Potchi ("Libérez Potchi")
 Stupid ("Stupide Machine")
 Oh! Busta Para-Dance ("Le marathon de Java-Danse")
 Fishing For Trouble ("En queue de poisson")
 Raucous Caucus ("Votez Bunny!")
 OnYooo
 Bunny Story ("De mémoire de Bunny")
 Stan's Perfect Match ("Stan, cœur à prendre")
 Doctor Ookie ("Docteur Ookie")	
 Charity ("Charité bien ordonnée")
 Sick Bunny ("Bunny est malade")
 Lost and Found ("Candy tombe des nues")
 It's on the Cards ("Mystique en toc")
 Heavenly Scent ("Bunny au parfum")
 Hypochondriac ("Alerte à l'haleine verte")
 The Good, the Bad, and the Cookie ("Cookie folies")
 Carrots Are Health ("Les carottes, c'est la santé")
 Promo ("Sauvetage en promo")
 Passport to Bunnyvania ("Viva Bunnyvania")
 Cold Turkey ("Pas de burgers pour Bunny")
 Think Extinct ("Un problème de taille")
 Rabbit vs. Rabbit ("Lapin contre lapin")
 The D-Fixitup ("D-Répare-Tout")
 We Come in Peace ("Nous arrivons en paix")
 In Memory of Bunny ("Feu Bunny")
 Full House ("Gros comme une maison")
 Judgement Day ("Jugement dernier")
 A Computer’s Love ("Mon ordi a du cœur")
 Trading Spaces ("Vis ma vie")
 Bunny Burns the Boards ("Bunny brûle les planches")
 Made For TV ("Echec et audimat")
 The Legend of Bagman ("La légende de Sac Man")

 Production 
It is based on Pinpin le Lapin: L'attaque de rogue geant, a Flash animation (with some 3D elements) originally published on Studio Tanuki's website. Aimed at an older audience, the pilot parodies anime tropes, has gags based on fighting games, and even references specific anime, like Sailor Moon''. After it was greenlit for a kids' show, production of the show started in 2007. The show was originally intended to air on March 29, 2009, but was cancelled at the last minute - due to the leaders of Canal+ Family finding the show unsuitable to air on Cartoon+, a block aiming for young audiences. The show was later delayed to a new premiere date at June. An official Microsoft PowerPoint presentation was made for the show, likely intended as a pitch bible. It included several details like the show's synopsis, character profiles and various ideas, such as character emotes, official games and manga. A few animators and layout artists also have posted videos, of their contributions to the show's animation (mostly) on Vimeo. One by Vimeo user "felixlechA", demonstrating some of the show's official rigs, notes that the show uses Softimage XSI and Autodesk Maya.

Humor

Bunny Maloney heavily relied on Blue Comedy. As described in the presentation, It was supposed to be an “adult-escent”  comedy action. For instance A scene of Candy Pole Dancing can be found on 3 episodes. Another example is that In “Think Extinct” Most of the episode, Candy teaches Bunny and Jean-François about Reproduction specifically Fish and Rabbits. At the end of the episode, Candy is about to Teach them more but Bunny and Jean-François run away then hide in fear.

The humor was most likely brought from the pilot, which was for an older audience. This gave highly negative criticism due to it being a kids show

Awards

Voice cast

French 
 Martial le Minoux - Bunny Maloney
 Élisabeth Ventura - Candy Bunny
 Marc Duquesnoy - Professor Débilouman, Louis Picollin
 Corinne Martin - Charlotte
 Laurent Pasquier - Stan Ookie
 Vincent Violette - Modchi
 François Jérosme - Noacak

English 
 Matt Wilkinson - Bunny Maloney
 Jules de Jongh - Candy Bunny
 Tom Clarke-Hill - Unknown
 Walter Lewis - Professor Débilouman, ROBOT
 Keith Wickham - Stan Ookie, Modchi
 Phillipa Alexander - Charlotte, Secretary Octopus
 Dan Russell - Additional voices

Broadcast

References

Anime-influenced Western animated television series
French children's animated action television series
French children's animated comedy television series
Animated television series about rabbits and hares
French computer-animated television series
2000s French animated television series
2009 French television series debuts
2010s French animated television series
French-language television shows
Cel-shaded animation
Canal+ original programming
2009 French television series endings